Neyneh (also Romanized as Nīneh; also known as Naina) is a village in Khurheh Rural District, in the Central District of Mahallat County, Markazi Province, Iran. At the 2006 census, its population was 156, in 65 families.

References 

Populated places in Mahallat County